The Europe Zone was one of the three regional zones of the 1983 Davis Cup.

25 teams entered the Europe Zone in total, split across two sub-zones. The winner of each sub-zone was promoted to the following year's World Group.

West Germany defeated Switzerland in the Zone A final, and Yugoslavia defeated Hungary in the Zone B final, resulting in both West Germany and Yugoslavia being promoted to the 1984 World Group.

Participating nations
Zone A: 

Zone B:

Zone A

Draw

First round

Poland vs. Belgium

Monaco vs. Luxembourg

Portugal vs. Netherlands

Quarterfinals

Belgium vs. West Germany

Monaco vs. Israel

Egypt vs. Netherlands

Switzerland vs. Greece

Semifinals

Israel vs. West Germany

Switzerland vs. Netherlands

Final

West Germany vs. Switzerland

Zone B

Draw

First round

Turkey vs. Zimbabwe

Austria vs. Morocco

Algeria vs. Bulgaria

Yugoslavia vs. Tunisia

Quarterfinals

Hungary vs. Zimbabwe

Norway vs. Austria

Bulgaria vs. Finland

Spain vs. Yugoslavia

Semifinals

Austria vs. Hungary

Bulgaria vs. Yugoslavia

Final

Yugoslavia vs. Hungary

References

External links
Davis Cup official website

Davis Cup Europe/Africa Zone
Europe Zone